Marco Serpellini (born 4 August 1972, in Lovere) is an Italian former road bicycle racer.

Major results

1989
 3rd Overall Grand Prix Rüebliland
1st Stage 4
1990
 1st  Road race, UCI Road World Championships
 1st Trofeo Emilio Paganessi
1992
 1st 
1994
 3rd Overall Hofbrau Cup
1995
 4th Chrono des Herbiers
 10th Gent–Wevelgem
 10th Trofeo Laigueglia
 10th Overall Tour Méditerranéen
 10th Firenze–Pistoia
1996
 1st Grand Prix Pino Cerami
 4th Overall Driedaagse van De Panne-Koksijde
 10th Overall Tirreno–Adriatico
 10th Overall Vuelta a Murcia
1997
 3rd Tre Valli Varesine
 8th Trofeo dello Scalatore
1998
 1st Overall Volta a Portugal
1st Stage 4
 1st Giro del Piemonte
 1st Grand Prix Pino Cerami
 2nd GP d'Europe (with Marco Velo)
 3rd Milano–Torino
 4th Firenze–Pistoia
 5th De Brabantse Pijl
 5th GP de la Ville de Rennes
 6th Giro del Veneto
 7th Giro di Lombardia
 9th Overall Vuelta a España
 10th Overall Driedaagse van De Panne-Koksijde
1999
 2nd Giro del Piemonte
 2nd Coppa Sabatini
 4th Breitling Grand Prix
 5th Paris–Tours
 5th GP Rik Van Steenbergen
 6th Luk-Cup Bühl
 7th Giro di Lombardia
 7th Giro del Lazio
 8th Paris–Brussels
 9th Firenze–Pistoia
 10th Overall Ronde van Nederland
 10th Giro dell'Emilia
2000
 1st Gran Premio Bruno Beghelli
 1st Stage 3 Bicicleta Vasca
 3rd Japan Cup Cycle Road Race
 5th Overall Tirreno–Adriatico
 7th Coppa Bernocchi
 8th Overall Giro della Provincia di Lucca
 8th Kuurne–Brussels–Kuurne
 9th Giro del Lazio
 9th Overall Driedaagse van De Panne-Koksijde
 9th Trofeo Pantalica
2001
 4th Japan Cup Cycle Road Race
 7th Züri-Metzgete
 8th Giro della Provincia di Siracusa
 9th Trofeo Pantalica
2002
 4th Giro di Lombardia
 5th Milano–Torino
 5th Giro del Lazio
 6th Giro di Romagna
2003
 1st Gran Premio Città di Camaiore
 1st Mountains classification International Tour of Rhodes
2004
 4th Giro del Lazio
2006
 6th Overall Ster Elektrotoer
 8th Overall Course de la Paix
1st Stage 4

Grand Tour general classification results timeline

External links

Palmarès by cyclingbase.com 

1972 births
Living people
Cyclists from the Province of Bergamo
Italian male cyclists
People from Lovere
Volta a Portugal winners